The Democratic Alliance of Greens (DSZ) was a political party in Bosnia and Herzegovina.

History
The DSZ contested the 1990 parliamentary elections in an alliance with the Democratic Socialist Alliance and the League of Socialist Youth, with the parties winning one seat each.

References

Defunct political parties in Bosnia and Herzegovina
Political parties in Yugoslavia